The Triple-Cities Triplets were a minor league baseball team in the northwest United States, located in Richland, Washington, one of the Tri-Cities. The Triplets were members of the Class A short-season Northwest League for four seasons, from 1983 through 1986.

History
After an eight year absence, professional baseball returned to the Tri-Cities area as New Jersey-based Big Six Sports purchased the Walla Walla Padres franchise following the 1982 season. Seeking a larger market and improved facilities, the new ownership group promptly moved the club west  to Richland, and took the outfield fence with them. The team adopted the unique name, Tri-Cities Triplets, and were an affiliate of the Texas Rangers.

In their inaugural season in 1983, the team compiled a  record, third in the Washington Division, jockeying with the Blue Mountain Bears down the stretch for the runner-up position. The team's home attendance was just shy of forty-nine thousand and they hosted the Northwest League All-Star Game. 

The Triplets hosted the Medford A's in the championship game on Labor Day. In a game with 34 hits, the Triplets had eighteen and outscored the A's 17–8 to claim the Northwest League crown. Coinciding with their on field success, home attendance exceeded fifty-two thousand.

Coming off a league championship, the club witnessed substantial changes, as Southern California-based attorney Richard Leavitt led a group that purchased the franchise. The new owners hoped to build on the success of the previous season, but that proved to be difficult in 1985 as the Texas Rangers declined extending their player development contract.

The franchise again changed hands entering 1986 as Tri-Cities Baseball Inc., composed of Brett family members (including George Brett), purchased the club. The new owners identified the need for a facility renovations or a new stadium as being necessary for long term viability.

Following two consecutive last place finishes and no prospect of improved facilities, the relocation of the team was imminent. The Brett group, who also owned the Spokane Indians, sold the team. Diamond Sports took control of the franchise with approval to relocate, and moved to Boise, Idaho, for the 1987 season and became the Boise Hawks. The franchise remains there, but switched to the Pioneer League in 2021.

Ballpark
The Triplets played at the Richland Bomber Bowl, now known as Fran Rish Stadium, located at 1350 Lee Boulevard in Richland. The stadium is still in use today, serving as a football-only facility for Richland High School.

Season-by-season record

References

External links
 Stats Crew Tri-Cities Triplets 1984
 Baseball Reference Triplets 1984
 Minor League Geek City Clusters

Defunct Northwest League teams
Texas Rangers minor league affiliates
Professional baseball teams in Washington (state)
Defunct baseball teams in Washington (state)
Richland, Washington
Baseball teams established in 1983
Baseball teams disestablished in 1986